Laban-e Olya (also Romanized as Labān-e ‘Olyā) is a village in Silakhor Rural District, Silakhor District, Dorud County, Lorestan Province, Iran. At the 2006 census, its population was 308, in 73 families.

References 

Towns and villages in Dorud County